Drago Milović (born 23 May 1994) is a Montenegrin professional footballer who plays for Serbian club OFK Bačka, as a forward.

Career
Born in Budva, Milović has played for Mogren, Amkar Perm, TPS, Grbalj and Žarkovo.

References

External links
Drago Milović at Prva Liga

1994 births
Living people
Montenegrin footballers
FK Mogren players
FC Amkar Perm players
Turun Palloseura footballers
OFK Grbalj players
OFK Žarkovo players
FK Kabel players
OFK Bačka players
Montenegrin First League players
Veikkausliiga players
Serbian First League players
Association football forwards
Montenegrin expatriate footballers
Montenegrin expatriate sportspeople in Russia
Expatriate footballers in Russia
Montenegrin expatriate sportspeople in Finland
Expatriate footballers in Finland
Montenegrin expatriate sportspeople in Serbia
Expatriate footballers in Serbia